The seventh and final season of The Golden Girls premiered on NBC on September 21, 1991, and concluded on May 9, 1992. The season consisted of 26 episodes. It was the only season of the show that aired additional scenes during the final credits, and the first to feature no reused clips from prior episodes since season 2.

Broadcast history
The season originally aired Saturdays at 8:00-8:30 pm (EST) on NBC from September 21, 1991, to May 9, 1992. The Nielsen ratings of this season suffered following NBC's ill-advised decision to move the show away from Saturdays at 9:00-9:30 pm (EST), which was the timeslot it occupied for the  past 6 seasons. As well as that, it faced direct competition from ABC's Who's the Boss?.

Episodes

References

External links

Golden Girls (season 7)
1991 American television seasons
1992 American television seasons